Rajib Ghorui (born 8 October 1995 in Dakshineswar) is an Indian professional footballer who plays as a midfielder for Aryan FC in the Calcutta Football League.

Career

Early career
Ghorui was born in Dakshineswar and started playing football at a young age when he joined Jugo Jagaran Coaching Camp where he used to practice under Ranjan Bhattacharya. Rajib who initially used to play as a striker, joined the U-15 East Bengal F.C. team which participated in the Manchester United Premier Cup. He was the highest scorer in the Indian leg of the Manchester United Cup played at Chandigarh.

Rajib joined Mohun Bagan SAIL Football Academy in 2007, where he stayed for one year before joining BN Railways. It was in BN Railways that Rajib was first used as a wing half; he played in both left and right half that year.

In 2010, he represented the U-19 Bengal team in B.C. Roy Trophy. In the final against Chandigarh, he gave West Bengal the lead but unfortunately the opponents equalised in the 2nd half, which took the match to penalty shootout. Though Bengal lost 3–5 in tie-breaker, he was successful in converting his penalty.

Rajib also got selected in the India U-19 team in 2010. During the China tour, in one of the games he scored a stunning goal by a left footed direct free-kick. He once again got a call from the U-19 National Team 2 years later. He had also played in the I-League U19 for East Bengal F.C.

Ghorui joined Techno Aryan F.C. in 2010 where he played for 3 seasons. He played many matches for Aryans in the I-League 2nd Division, IFA Shield as well as Calcutta Football League. One of the most memorable matches of his career was when Aryans defeated East Bengal F.C. 4–1 in Calcutta Premier Division. One of the goals that Charles scored in that game was from Rajib's well-measured right-footed free kick.

Mohun Bagan
Rajib first got the offer from a United Sikkim F.C. in 2012, though he did not join the club. After Mohun Bagan officials contacted him at the start of this season and he decided to join them.

He made his debut in the I-League on 10 October 2013 against Pune F.C. at the Balewadi Sports Complex in which he came on as a substitute for Sabeeth in the 87th minute as Mohun Bagan lost the match 2–0.

Career statistics

Personal life
Rajib is a fan of Cristiano Ronaldo and Syed Nabi, he is basically a right footed player, though he is confident to shoot with both feet. He supports Manchester United F.C. and England national football team among the International Clubs and Countries.

References

External links 
 

1995 births
Living people
Indian footballers
Mohun Bagan AC players
Footballers from West Bengal
I-League players
I-League 2nd Division players
India youth international footballers
Association football midfielders
Aryan FC players